This is a survey of the postage stamps and postal history of Niue.

Niue is an island country in the South Pacific Ocean. It is commonly known as the "Rock of Polynesia", and inhabitants of the island call it "the Rock" for short.

First stamps
The first stamps of Niue, issued on 4 January 1902, were overprints of then-current New Zealand stamps. The first stamps inscribed “Niue” were the 1920 pictorial series.

Later issues

Niue stamps are now issued on a regular basis.

The Niue Philatelic and Numismatic Company, established by the Niue Philatelic and Numismatic Act 1996, was established “to administer philatelic, numismatic and other revenue earning options and services.” Stamps are currently issued on behalf of this company by New Zealand Post, and are sold at face value through the New Zealand Post web site.

2011 Royal Wedding
In 2011, Niue was forced to defend a pair of stamps issued for the Wedding of Prince William and Catherine Middleton that split the royal couple when the stamps were separated for use.

See also
Postage stamps and postal history of Aitutaki
Postage stamps and postal history of the Cook Islands
Postage stamps and postal history of Penrhyn

References

Further reading 
Jensen, Paul. Cook Islands - Rarotonga, Aitutaki, Penrhyn, Niue. 1988.

External links
The Pacific Islands Study Circle.

Communications in Niue
Niue